is a railway station  in Ōita City, Ōita Prefecture, Japan. It is operated by JR Kyushu and is on the Kyudai Main Line.

Lines

Layout 
The station, which is unstaffed, consists of two side platforms serving two tracks with a siding. There is no station building but each platform has a shelter for passengers. One shelter also houses an automatic ticket vending machine. Access to the opposite side platform is by means of a level crossing.

Adjacent stations

History
JR Kyushu opened the station on 11 March 1989 as an additional station on the existing track of the Kyudai Main Line.

Passenger statistics
In fiscal 2016, the station was used by an average of 333 passengers daily (boarding passengers only), and it ranked 295th among the busiest stations of JR Kyushu.

See also
List of railway stations in Japan

References

External links
Bungo-Kokubu (JR Kyushu)

Railway stations in Ōita Prefecture
Railway stations in Japan opened in 1989
Ōita (city)